Julia Müller (born 10 December 1985) is a German field hockey national team player who competed in the 2008 Summer Olympics and the 2012 Summer Olympics.

References

External links
 
 
 
 

1985 births
Living people
German female field hockey players
Olympic field hockey players of Germany
Field hockey players at the 2008 Summer Olympics
Field hockey players at the 2012 Summer Olympics
Field hockey players at the 2016 Summer Olympics
Olympic bronze medalists for Germany
Olympic medalists in field hockey
Medalists at the 2016 Summer Olympics
Field hockey players from Hamburg
21st-century German women